Jane O'Donoghue (born 29 March 1983) is a retired British tennis player who turned professional in 2000 and played her last match on the pro circuit in 2007. During her career, she won three ITF singles and six ITF doubles titles. In July 2006, she reached a career-high singles ranking of 189, and over one year later she reached 184 in the world in the doubles rankings. O'Donoghue reached the second round of her home Grand Slam, Wimbledon two years in a row, in 2004 and 2005. After retirement, she began working for the LTA as a coach and currently coaches British junior, Katy Dunne.

Personal life
O'Donoghue was born in the Metropolitan Borough of Wigan in Greater Manchester in 1983. Her father, John, is a PE teacher, her mother works in a bank and her two older brothers, Paul and Mark, both studied at the University of Oxford. She has 10 GCSEs all of which are grade A. She began playing tennis aged nine and turned professional at the age of 17. Other than tennis, her interests are football, netball and music.

Career

Junior (1997–2001)
O'Donoghue competed on the junior ITF Circuit from July 1997 until June 2001. She won one singles title over the course of her four-year career, at the 2001 Japan Open Junior Championships, and also became a semifinalist four times and a quarterfinalist on eight occasions. She reached the second round of Wimbledon twice in 2000 and 2001 but her greatest junior Grand Slam success came in 2001 when Jane reached the third round of the Australian Open. Her junior career ended with a singles win–loss record of 40–32 and a career-high ranking of world No. 28 (achieved 2 January 2001).

O'Donoghue won her only junior doubles title in August 1999 partnering Elena Baltacha. Aside from this she also reached three more finals, three semifinals and seven quarterfinals. With Anna Hawkins as her partner, she managed to reach the second round of Wimbledon girls' doubles in 2001 where they lost to Gisela Dulko and Ashley Harkleroad. This was the furthest Jane progressed in a Grand Slam doubles tournament. This success led her to finish her career with a doubles win–loss record of 25–30 and a career-high ranking of world No. 73 (achieved 5 February 2001).

1998–2001
O'Donoghue played her first match on the adult ITF Circuit in September 1998 in the qualifying draw for the $10k in Sunderland. She lost in the second round of the qualifying tournament and finished the season without a world ranking.

She attempted to qualify for three $10k events in 1999 but did not win a match. She again finished the season without a world ranking.

O'Donoghue started her 2000 season with her first ever main draw ITF appearance courtesy of a wildcard into the $10k event in Hatfield where she fell in round one. She was beaten by fellow Brit, Alice Barnes, in round one of the ITF in Swansea before being given a wild card into the qualifying draw of Wimbledon and again being beaten by Barnes in her first match. In August, O'Donoghue made a surprise run to the final of a $10k in Bath where she was beaten by Susi Bensch and she continued her momentum by following this up with a run to the quarterfinals of an ITF in London ($10k). She finished the year with a ranking of world no. 564.

O'Donoghue had very little in the way of success on the ITF Circuit in 2001 but was nevertheless given a wildcard into the qualifying draw of Wimbledon where she beat world No. 136, Maja Palaversic, in the first round before losing to Stéphanie Foretz in her second match. O'Donoghue's next tournament was in the $25k in Felixstowe where she had to retire in the first round. She did not compete again that year. Her year-end ranking was world No. 471.

2002
Returning to the tour in January 2002, O'Donoghue reached the quarterfinals of the $10k in Hull. In March, she reached the semifinals of the $10k in Amiens as a qualifier and two months later in May, she won her first professional title in Bournemouth, beating Yvonne Doyle in the final in straight sets. Just two weeks later she won the second ITF title of her career, this one in Hatfield, beating all three top seeds on the way to the title. In June, she made her debut on the WTA Tour in the qualifying draw of the Tier III DFS Classic in Birmingham, courtesy of a wildcard. She lost to Antonella Serra Zanetti. This was immediately followed by another wildcard into the qualifying draw of a British WTA tournament, the Tier II Britannic Asset Management International where she was beaten by Marissa Irvin. She then received a wildcard into the main draw of Wimbledon where she lost to the top seed Venus Williams in the first round. In the second half of the year, she reached two quarterfinals of $25k tournaments and finished the year with a ranking of world No. 295.

2003
In her first tournament of 2003 saw Jane reach the semifinals of the $10k in Tallahassee. She competed for Great Britain in the Fed Cup and won one out of three singles rubbers as well as losing her only doubles rubber. In May she reached the final of the $10k event in Edinburgh and lost to Elise Tamaëla. She then entered the $25k in Surbiton and reached the quarterfinals before losing to Anne Keothavong. She beat compatriot, Elena Baltacha, in the first round of the DFS Classic in June to give her the first win of her career on the WTA Tour; world No. 13, Magdalena Maleeva, beat her in the second round. This was followed up with a wildcard into the Aegon International qualifying draw where she lost in the first round. She was also given a wildcard into Wimbledon and was beaten in round one by Marlene Weingärtner. She then reached the quarterfinals of the $25k in Toruń and in September, the semifinals of another $25k, this one in Glasgow. Her season-ending ranking was world No. 235.

2004
O'Donoghue began her 2004 season by reaching the quarterfinals of a $50k in Waikoloa where she lost a three set match to María Emilia Salerni. She competed in doubles as part of the British team in the Fed Cup partnering Amanda Janes in one match and Elena Baltacha in the other two. They won two out of their three matches, the one they lost being against sisters, Gabriela and Monica Niculescu. In April and May she reached two consecutive $25k quarterfinals in Bari and Stockholm, losing to Kateryna Bondarenko and Hanna Nooni respectively. In June she received a wild card into the DFS Classic, a Tier III event, where she was beaten in round one by Émilie Loit. She then headed to the qualifying draw for the Hastings Direct International (again courtesy of a wildcard) where she was beaten in the first round of qualifying by fellow Brit, Elena Baltacha. The third of three consecutive wild cards granted her direct entry into Wimbledon, her home Grand Slam event. O'Donoghue managed to make the most of this opportunity by beating Lindsay Lee-Waters the first round, to give her the first Grand Slam main-draw victory of her career. Following Wimbledon, she reached the quarterfinals of another $25k before failing to qualify for a number of lower-tier WTA tournaments. In August, she lost a tight match in the first round of qualifying for the US Open to Vanina García Sokol, 6–7(4), 6–7(4). She finished the rest of the year without progressing past the second round in any ITF tournaments and her year-end ranking was world No. 231.

2005
2005 began with three consecutive first-round losses for O'Donoghue in ITF events, although she and Katie O'Brien did team up to win the doubles title in the first event of the year in Tipton. In February she reached two consecutive $25k quarterfinals, losing to Rika Fujiwara and Olga Savchuk. She had some degree of success in $50k events in May, reaching the semifinals of one in Gifu and the quarterfinals of the next in Fukuoka. In April she and O'Brien played three doubles rubbers together as part of the Great Britain team in the Fed Cup when they won one out of three matches. As in 2004, she received consecutive wildcards into the qualifying draws for the DFS Classic and the Hastings Direct International where she was beaten in the first round of qualifying in both events. She was again given a wildcard into Wimbledon where she battled to beat Anna-Lena Grönefeld, 1–6, 6–1, 6–4, in the first round, only to be overcome by Nathalie Dechy in round two. She and Baltacha also teamed up to reach the second round in doubles by beating Mariana Díaz Oliva and Martina Suchá. She had no more success on the ITF Circuit until late November when she reached the quarterfinals two $25k events in Australia. Her year-end ranking was world No. 250.

2006
2006 did not begin well for O'Donoghue; before heading into the qualifying draws for the DFS Classic, the Aegon International and Wimbledon, she had accumulated a win–loss record of 3–15 in main draw ITF matches. She lost in straight sets in the first round of the qualifying draws for both the DFS Classic and the Hastings Direct International and then reached the second round of qualifying for Wimbledon. Following this, she reached her first ITF semifinal of the season in a $10k in Frinton where she lost to Georgie Stoop. In August she was the runner-up in another $10k and a quarterfinalist in yet another. She reached the quarterfinals of only one more ITF tournament before the end of the year and her season-ending ranking was world No. 336.

2007
In March 2007 O'Donoghue won the title in a $10k event in Jersey before going on to reach the semifinals of her next in Sunderland and the quarterfinals of her next in Bath. She then lost in the qualifying draws for a number of higher-tier ITF tournaments before retiring from professional tennis in April.

ITF Circuit finals

Singles: 6 (3–3)

Doubles: 11 (6–5)

Grand Slam performance timeline

References

External links
 
 
 

1983 births
Living people
English people of Irish descent
English female tennis players
English tennis coaches
Sportspeople from Wigan
British female tennis players
Tennis people from Greater Manchester